Deborah Carter (born January 3, 1972) is a former professional basketball player.

References

1972 births
Utah Starzz players
Washington Mystics players
Georgia Lady Bulldogs basketball players
Living people